San Marcos High School is a high school in the North County city of San Marcos, California. San Marcos High School is a member of the San Marcos Unified School District and serves students from San Marcos, Vista, and Carlsbad. Out of the 4 high schools in the district, it the largest in San Marcos Unified by student enrollment at more than 3000 in 2021.

Academics
San Marcos High School had a graduation rate of 99% for the Class of 2020. The Academic Performance Index was an annual measure of the academic performance
and progress of schools in California. API scores ranged from 200-1,000, with a statewide target
of 800. San Marcos High School’s last API score was 857.

Departments
San Marcos High School offers several classes and organizations:

Agriculture / FFA
ASB
College and Career Center
Computer Technology
Counseling
CTE (Career Technical Education) Programs
English
English Learner Program (EL)
History
Industrial Technology
Math
P.E.
Performing Arts
ROP Flower Design
Science
Special Education
Visual Arts
World Languages

Air Force JROTC
San Marcos JROTC is a program run by retired Air Force Major Mark McLouth, and retired Air Force Master Sergeant Michael Lazare. Founded in 2009, the program was created with the intention to promote values of integrity, service, and excellence among students. Cadets enrolled would experience a multisubject program involving aerospace science, physical training, United States Air Force history, military drills, military dress and appearance, and general life skills over the course of the year.

Programs

PACE Promise
The PACE Promise, a joint program of San Marcos Unified School District (SMUSD) and California State University San Marcos (CSUSM), guarantees CSUSM admission to all district students continuously enrolled in the district from 9th through 12th grade who meet entrance requirements.

Notable alumni 

 Eddie Sanchez – Professional mixed martial artist, former UFC heavyweight
 Chad Ackerman –  Lead singer for the band Destroy the Runner
 Paloma Young – Professional costume designer
 Terrell Burgess - NFL free safety for the Los Angeles Rams

References

Educational institutions established in 1961
High schools in San Diego County, California
Public high schools in California
Education in San Marcos, California
1961 establishments in California